Alex Ekström (4 October 1883 – 20 February 1958) was a Swedish cyclist. He competed in two events at the 1912 Summer Olympics.

References

External links
 

1883 births
1958 deaths
Swedish male cyclists
Olympic cyclists of Sweden
Cyclists at the 1912 Summer Olympics
People from Enköping
Sportspeople from Uppsala County